Self-portrait is a  1629-1630 oil on panel painting by Dutch artist Jan Lievens. The portrait has been in private collections but recently it has been exhibited worldwide as part of the Leiden Collection.

History
The painting by Jan Lievens was completed  1629-1630 in Leiden. It is in a private collection. The painting was first exhibited in 1957 at the Alfred Brod Gallery in London. From October 26, 2008 to January 11, 2009, The painting was on display in Washington D.C. at the National Gallery of Art at an exhibition which was titled, "Jan who?". From 2017-2019 the painting was on loan to The Leiden Collection as it toured the world in museum exhibitions.

Description
It is a  ×  oil on panel self-portrait painting. Lievens painted himself looking away from the viewer. He painted himself with long flowing hair and strong features. Light comes from the upper left to accentuate his cheekbone and show off his skin. He also painted the fine hair of his narrow mustache. 

Using dendrochronology (tree ring dating), examinations of the painting and panel revealed that that the self-portrait was painted on an oak panel which was from the same tree as Rembrandt’s 1629-30 painting Samson and Delilah. X-radiographs of the self-portrait have shown that Lievens made "transformative revisions to his appearance" in the portrait several times. He painted over a hat which was tilted on his head, and he changed the head to a tilting forward position. He also changed the hair in the painting, adding flowing locks on the left, possibly to emulate the Flemish or English courtly hairstyles.

Reception
In 2008 the painting was exhibited at the The National Gallery of Art in Washington D.C.. For the exhibition the museum published a brochure authored by  American art historian Arthur K. Wheelock Jr. titled, "Jan Lievens A Dutch Master Rediscovered". In the publication, Wheelock describes the self-portrait as "handsome and assured", revealing Lievens "ability to evoke the essence of a person through features alone".

References

External links

Jan Lievens: The Leiden Collection

17th-century paintings
Self-portraits
Paintings by Jan Lievens